Flags of white, red and blue stripes (bands) are closely associated with independence and the French Revolution. It can often signal the relationships of some nations with other nations (for instance, the flag of the Netherlands and flags of its former colonies).

The Dutch tricolor, the first known example of the tricolor, stood for liberty and republicanism, and the Netherlands flag influenced the tricolour flags of France and Russia.

The flag model was put forward in the French Revolution with the tricolore, a term which to this day, can refer to the flag of France directly, rather than all tricolors. The French Tricolour has become one of the most influential flags in history, with its three-colour scheme being adopted by many other nations, both in Europe and the rest of the world, and, according to the Encyclopædia Britannica has historically stood "in symbolic opposition to the autocratic and clericalist royal standards of the past".

With an independent origin, the British Union Jack was drawn up to represent the union of England and Scotland. The American flag or Stars and Stripes made a major contribution to the modern flag tradition and the idea of a flag representing both population and government, like the French flag after the Revolution.

The various blue, white, and red striped banners were adopted, somewhat changing the order and position of stripes (vertical and horizontal). The Russian flag was adopted by Peter the Great based on the Dutch flag, during his effort to build a Western-oriented navy.

They also became the Pan-Slavic colors, particularly Austro-Slavism in countries that became independent from the Austro-Hungarian monarchy.

Dual bands 

 , national, cantoned
, within USA, cantoned
 , within USA, cantoned
  Lubbock, within USA, charged
  Murphy, within USA, charged
 , within Argentina, charged
  Kansas City, Missouri, within USA, charged

Triband

Five bands

More than five bands 
 , national, cantoned
 , within USA, cantoned
 , national, cantoned
 , national, cantoned
 , within Malaysia,  charged
  Serapis flag of the American Revolution, cantoned
 , within Confederate States of America, 1861, cantoned

Different directions 
 , 1830–1859
, within Netherlands, cantoned, 1954-2010
 , within Argentina
  Arlington, within USA, charged
  Memphis, within USA, charged
 , within French Polynesia, charged
  United Kingdom (Union Jack), national flag
List of countries and territories with the Union Jack displayed on their flag
, national, cantoned
, national, cantoned

See also 

List of flags by color combination
List of flags by design
Tricolor

References 

Stripes
Blue, red and white
 Color, blue, red, and white